Onni Pellinen (14 February 1899 – 30 October 1950) was a Finnish wrestler and Olympic medalist in Greco-Roman wrestling.

Olympics
Pellinen competed at the 1924 Summer Olympics in Paris where he won a bronze medal in Greco-Roman wrestling, the light heavyweight class.

He won another bronze medal at the 1928 Summer Olympics in Amsterdam.

At the 1932 Summer Olympics in Los Angeles he won a silver medal.

References

1899 births
1950 deaths
People from Hankasalmi
People from Kuopio Province (Grand Duchy of Finland)
Olympic wrestlers of Finland
Wrestlers at the 1924 Summer Olympics
Wrestlers at the 1928 Summer Olympics
Wrestlers at the 1932 Summer Olympics
Finnish male sport wrestlers
Olympic silver medalists for Finland
Olympic bronze medalists for Finland
Olympic medalists in wrestling
Medalists at the 1924 Summer Olympics
Medalists at the 1928 Summer Olympics
Medalists at the 1932 Summer Olympics
Sportspeople from Central Finland
19th-century Finnish people
20th-century Finnish people